Program management is the process of managing several related projects, often with the intention of improving an organization's performance. It is distinct from project management.

In practice and in its aims, program management is often closely related to systems engineering, industrial engineering, change management, and business transformation. In the defense sector, it is the dominant approach to managing large projects. Because major defense programs entail working with contractors, it is also called acquisition management, indicating that the government buyer acquires goods and services by means of contractors.

The program manager has oversight of the purpose and status of the projects in a program and can use this oversight to support project-level activity to ensure the program goals are met by providing a decision-making capacity that cannot be achieved at project level or by providing the project manager with a program perspective when required, or as a sounding board for ideas and approaches to solving project issues that have program impacts. The program manager may be well-placed to provide this insight by actively seeking out such information from the project managers, although in large and/or complex projects, a specific role may be required. However this insight arises, the program manager needs this in order to be comfortable that the overall program goals are achievable.

Overview and definition 

Many programs focus on delivering a capability to change and are normally designed to deliver the organization's strategy or business transformation. Program management also emphasizes the coordinating and prioritizing of resources across projects, managing links between the projects and the overall costs and risks of the program.

The Project Management Institute, an American nonprofit professional association for project management, thusly summarizes: "a Program is a group of related projects managed in a coordinated manner to obtain benefits and control NOT available from managing them individually. Programs may include elements of related work outside of the scope of the discrete projects in the program...  Some projects within a program can deliver useful incremental benefits to the organization before the program itself has completed."

In public sector work in Europe, the term normally refers to multiple change projects: projects that are designed to deliver benefits to the host organization, for example, the Office of Government Commerce for the UK government.

Many organizations only run one program at a time in the form of an overarching program containing all their projects. In Project Management Institute terminology, this is more likely to be a project portfolio than a program.   Some larger organizations may have multiple programs each designed to deliver a range of improvements. Some organizations use the concept of systems engineering where others use program management.

Standards 
 Since 1999: MSP from AXELOS
 Since 2007: PgMP from Project Management Institute

Key factors
 Benefits The key difference between a project and a program is that benefits are delivered within the program lifecycle compared to a project when they are delivered after the project has finished.
Governance The structure, process, and procedure to control internal operations and changes to performance objectives. Governance must include a set of metrics to indicate the health and progress of the program in the most vital areas.
Alignment The program must support a higher-level vision, goals, and objectives. These are set out in the program vision and blueprint, which defines the future state for the organization, sector or community that will be significantly changed.
Transformation A program will deliver major change, whether it is within an organization, a sector or a community. As such, the management of change and transition is a key characteristic of a program, not just the building a major capability.
Assurance Verify and validate the program, ensuring adherence to standards and alignment with the vision. Programs should always have an assurance strategy.
Management Ensure accountability through regular reviews, and that management of projects, stakeholders and suppliers is in place.
Integration Ensure that component parts fit together properly to make the intended whole. Optimize performance across the program value chain, functionally and technically.
Finances Track basic costs together with wider costs of administering the program and also the costs of change and transition to achieve benefits.
Infrastructure Allocation of resources influences the cost and success of the program. Infrastructure might cover offices, version control, and IT.
Planning Develop the plan bringing together the information on projects, resources, timescales, monitoring, and control.
Improvement Continuously assess performance; research and develop new capabilities, and systemically apply learning and knowledge to the program.

Comparison with project management
There are two different views of how programs differ from projects. In one view, projects deliver outputs, discrete parcels or "chunks" of change; programs create outcomes. In this view, a project might deliver a new factory, hospital or IT system. By combining these projects with other deliverables and changes, their programs might deliver increased income from a new product, shorter waiting lists at the hospital or reduced operating costs due to improved technology. The other view is that a program is nothing more than either a large project or a set (or portfolio) of projects. In this second view, the point of having a program is to exploit economies of scale and to reduce coordination costs and risks. The project manager's job is to ensure that the project succeeds. The program manager, on the other hand, is concerned with the aggregate outcome(s) or end-state result(s) of the collection of projects in a particular program. For example, in a financial institution, a program may include one project that is designed to take advantage of a rising market and another that is designed to protect against the downside of a falling market. The former seeks to leverage the potential upside; the latter to limit the possible downside. A simple analogy is Fix-a-Flat: this highly pressurized aerosol product injects a leak sealant into a punctured tire to stop the outflow of air (project A) and concurrently re-inflates the tire (project B), resulting together in the outcome that a tire that is once again functional (the program comprised projects A and B).

According to the view that programs deliver outcomes but projects deliver outputs, program management is concerned with doing the right projects. The program manager has been described as 'playing chess' and keeping the overview in mind, with the pieces to be used or sacrificed being the projects.  In contrast, project management is about doing projects right. And also according to this view, successful projects deliver on time, to budget, and to specification, whereas successful programs deliver long-term improvements to an organization. Improvements are usually identified through benefits. An organization should select the group of programs that most take it towards its strategic aims while remaining within its capacity to deliver the changes. On the other hand, the view that programs are simply large projects or a set of projects allows a program may need to deliver tangible benefits quickly.

According to one source, the key difference between a program and a project is the finite nature of a project – a project must always have a specific end date, else it is an ongoing program.

One view of the differences between a program and a project in business is that:
 A project is unique and is of definite duration. A program is ongoing and implemented within a business to consistently achieve certain results for the business.
 A project is designed to deliver an output or deliverable and its success will be in terms of delivering the right output at the right time and to the right cost.
 Program management includes management of projects which, together, improve the performance of the organization. A program's success will be measured in terms of benefits.
 Benefits are the measures of improvement of an organization and might include increased income, increased profits, decreased costs, improved market position (ability to compete), 
 In the course of achieving required results, business programs will normally understand related business constraints and determine the processes required to achieve results based on resources allocated.  Improvement of processes is a continuous operation that very much contrasts a program from a project.
reduced wastage or environmental damage, more satisfied customers. In central or local government organizations, benefits might include providing a better service to the community.
 In the course of achieving required results, business programs will normally understand related business constraints and determine the processes required to achieve results based on resources allocated.  Improvement of processes is a continuous operation that very much contrasts a program from a project
 At the lowest level project managers coordinate individual projects. They are overseen by the program manager who accounts to the program sponsor (or board).
 There will normally be a process to change the predetermined scope of a project. Programs often have to react to changes in strategy and changes in the environment in which the organization changes.

Another view and another successful way of managing does not see any of the factors listed above as distinguishing projects from programs, but rather sees the program as being about portfolio management. On this view, program management is about selecting projects, adjusting the speed at which they run, and adjusting their scope, in order to the maximize the value of the portfolio as a whole, and as economic or other external conditions change. Still, some emphasize that whereas a portfolio consists of independent projects, a program is a collection of interdependent projects, adding a dimension of complexity to the management task.

Yet another view is that a program management is nothing more than a large, complex project, where the integration aspect of project management is more important than in smaller projects. Integration management is a key feature of the Project Management Institute's approach to project management. Yet again, some accept there is a distinction related to interdependencies between the elements of a project and a program. In this view, a program is a comparably loosely coupled system, whereas large, complex projects are tightly coupled. This difference makes the project program a more ambiguous task to manage, with more uncertainty, reflecting a higher degree of freedom and a management task more open to exploit opportunities as they arise or the program management becomes aware of them.

In practice, it is not clear that there is a clear-cut distinction. Projects (or programs) vary from small and simple to large and complex; what needs to be managed as a program in one culture or organization may be managed as a project in another.

See also
 Cost overrun
 List of project management topics
 Project Management Institute
 Systems engineering
 Comparison of project management software
 Product manager

References

Notes

Sources

Further reading
 
 
 
 .
 
 
 
 .

External links
 Defense Acquisition University PM e-Tool Kit
 Project and Program Management Glossary
 Public Domain Programme Management-Framework
 Article Comparing Managing Successful Programmes approach to the PMI approach

Project management